Henry Ernest Davis (18 February 1879 – 23 October 1948) was an Australian rules footballer who played with Essendon in the Victorian Football League (VFL).

He represented the VFL, playing at full-forward (he kicked 3 goals), in a match against a combined Ballarat Football Association team, on the MCG, on 24 June 1905.

Notes

References 
 Maplestone, M., Flying Higher: History of the Essendon Football Club 1872–1996, Essendon Football Club, (Melbourne), 1996. 
 Ross, J. (ed), 100 Years of Australian Football 1897–1996: The Complete Story of the AFL, All the Big Stories, All the Great Pictures, All the Champions, Every AFL Season Reported, Viking, (Ringwood), 1996.

External links 

1879 births
1948 deaths
Australian rules footballers from Victoria (Australia)
Essendon Football Club players